Trullidens is an extinct genus of sphenodontian from the Late Triassic of Colorado, United States. The type species is Trullidens purgatorii.

References 

Sphenodontia
Prehistoric reptile genera
Triassic Colorado
Fossil taxa described in 2021